William B. Green (March 3, 1873 – November 21, 1952) was an American trade union leader. Green is best remembered as the president of the American Federation of Labor (AFL) from 1924 to 1952. He was a strong supporter for labor-management co-operation and was on the frontline for wage and benefit protections and industrial unionism legislation.

As president of the AFL, he continued the development of the federation away from the foundations of "pure and simple unionism" to a more politically active "social reform unionism."

Early life
Green was born March 3, 1873, in Coshocton, Ohio, the son of Welsh immigrants. His father was a coal miner. Green went to work himself in the coal mines in 1889, at 16.

Union career
He became involved in the trade union movement as a young miner and was elected as secretary of the Coshocton Progressive Miners Union in 1891. The Coshocton Progressive Miners Union later became a local of the United Mine Workers of America (UMWA). In 1890, Green became the subdistrict president of the UMWA; he became UMWA Ohio district president in 1906.

In 1910, he was elected to the Ohio Senate, where he served as both Senate president pro tempore and Democratic floor leader. As Ohio state senator, Green drafted and got passed a model Workmen’s Compensation Act in 1911. His accomplishments as state senator included Progressive Era legislation, including bills to limit the hours of women wage earners, institute a 1% income tax, elect Ohio's US senators by popular vote, and run judicial nonpartisan elections. Green’s experience and accomplishments contributed to his appointment as the UMWA's international statistician in 1911 and then as promotion to secretary-treasurer in 1913. He was named to the AFL's Executive Council in 1914 and became Secretary-Treasurer in 1916. His intensive involvement in labor had him serve as one of five delegates to the Paris Peace Conference in 1918.

In 1924, he became president of the AFL following the death of Samuel Gompers, he held the position until his own death. In 1933, Green's endeavors persuaded President Franklin D. Roosevelt to appoint him to the Labor Advisory Council of the National Recovery Administration. The following year, Green served on the National Labor Board. Later, President Harry Truman appointed Green to the National Advisory Committee on Mobilization during the Korean War.

He is best remembered for having presided over the split in the AFL, which led to the founding of the Congress of Industrial Organizations (CIO).

Strategy
Under Green's presidency in the 1920s, the AFL changed its political strategy of confrontation to one of co-operation. Unlike Green, Gompers had frequently projected an independent and confrontational approach for the federation, despite his affiliation to the National Civic Federation and to the Wilson administration.

Green favored a more co-operative style for the labor movement. He won public support for legislating benefits for all workers and co-operated with employers in the name of mutual self-interest and the collective good. Green supported union-management co-operation in everyday functions at the workplace. He also supported reducing hours of labor, as it would increase the worker's living standards and participation for civic engagement. Ultimately, Green supported a voluntary incomes policy between labor and management, binding higher wages to productivity growth.

Accomplishments
Green's support was critical to winning passage of the Norris-La Guardia Act of 1932, which reduced the practice of labor restrictions and banned the yellow-dog contract. Green was also successful in acquiring federation support for a national unemployment insurance system, sponsored largely by employer donations.

In 1935, Green facilitated the passage of the National Labor Relations Act, aimed at empowering workers' rights to organize and take part in collective bargaining. In 1938, Green helped pass the Fair Labor Standards Act, becoming the first federal law in instituting minimum wages and the 40-hour workweek.

Death
Green died November 21, 1952, at 79 in Coshocton, Ohio. He was buried in South Lawn Cemetery.

Legacy

Roosevelt University in Chicago, Illinois named its library after Green and colleague Philip Murray in the 1960s to distinguish the functions that unions played in the university's founding in 1945. The library honored their service in American labor and their contributions in funding educational opportunities for everyone. The Chicago Housing Authority named the William Green Homes public housing project after Green. He is a member of the Labor Hall of Fame.

See also

 American Federation of Labor
 Norris-La Guardia Act 
 National Labor Relations Act
 Fair Labor Standards Act
 George Meany, his successor at AFL
 Philip Murray CIO counterpart

References

Further reading

 Kersten, Andrew E. Labor's home front: the American Federation of Labor during World War II (NYU Press, 2006). online

 Phelan, Craig. William Green: Biography of a Labor Leader (State University of New York Press, 1989); short scholarly biography.
 Phelan, Craig Lawrence. "William Green and the limits of Christian idealism: the AFL years, 1924-1952" (PhD dissertation . The Ohio State University, 1984). online

 Phelan, Craig. "William Green and the ideal of Christian Cooperation," in Labor Leaders in America (1987): 134-159. online
 Taft, Philip. The A.F. of L. from the Death of Gompers to the Merger (1970)

External links

William Green biography, aflcio.org; accessed February 19, 2016
Max Danish, William Green, a pictorial biography 
Guide to American Federation of Labor. William Green. President's correspondence, 1926-1952. 5402mf. Kheel Center for Labor-Management Documentation and Archives, Martin P. Catherwood Library, Cornell University

1873 births
1952 deaths
American Federation of Labor people
American trade unionists of Welsh descent
People from Coshocton, Ohio
Presidents of the Ohio State Senate
United Mine Workers people